The 2020–21 Abilene Christian Wildcats men's basketball team represented Abilene Christian University (ACU) in the 2020–21 NCAA Division I men's basketball season. The Wildcats, led by tenth-year head coach Joe Golding, were members of the Southland Conference. Due to renovations at their usual home arena of Moody Coliseum, they played their home games on temporary stands and court set up on the indoor tennis courts of the Teague Special Events Center.

This was the Wildcats' final season in the Southland Conference. ACU and three other schools from Texas will leave that league on July 1, 2021 to join the Western Athletic Conference. They finished the season 24-5, 13-2 in Southland Play to finish in 2nd place. They defeated Lamar and Nicholls to be champions of the Southland tournament. They received the conference’s automatic bid to the NCAA tournament where they upset Texas in the first round before losing in the second round to UCLA.

Previous season
The Wildcats finished the 2019–20 season 20–11, 15–5 in Southland play to finish in a tie for second place. As the No. 2 seed, they received a double-bye to the semifinals of the Southland tournament, however, the tournament was cancelled amid the COVID-19 pandemic.

Roster

Schedule and results

|-
!colspan=12 style=| Non-conference Regular season

|-
!colspan=12 style=| Southland Regular season

|-
!colspan=9 style=| Southland tournament

|-
!colspan=9 style=| NCAA tournament

Source

Notes

References

Abilene Christian Wildcats men's basketball seasons
Abilene Christian Wildcats
Abilene Christian Wildcats men's basketball
Abilene Christian Wildcats men's basketball
Abilene Christian